Masood Iqbal Qureshi (17 April 1952, Lahore, Punjab – 31 October 2003) is a former Pakistani cricketer who played in a single One-day International (ODI) event in 1984. Prior to his international debut, Qureshi had toured Australia and New Zealand in 1972/73 and England in 1978, but was unable to play a Test match during either tour.

References

External links

1952 births
2003 deaths
Pakistan One Day International cricketers
Pakistani cricketers
Lahore cricketers
Lahore A cricketers
Lahore Greens cricketers
Punjab University cricketers
Lahore Blues cricketers
Punjab A cricketers
Habib Bank Limited cricketers
Lahore City Blues cricketers
Lahore City Whites cricketers
Punjab (Pakistan) cricketers
Cricketers from Lahore